The Nandi Award for First Best Documentary Film was commissioned since 1968: 

Nandi Award for the Second Best Documentary Film

Nandi Award for the Third Best Documentary Film

References

Documentary Film